The Cornell Big Red men's squash team is the intercollegiate men's squash team for Cornell University located in Ithaca, New York. The team competes in the Ivy League within the College Squash Association. The team was established in 1956. They play at the Belkin International Squash Courts at the Reis Tennis Center. The head coach is currently Australian former world number 1, David Palmer.

History 
Mark Devoy coached the team for 12 seasons from 2004 to 2016. He led the Big Red to be a steady presence in the top 8 nationally, with a 126-89 career record. The Big Red finished as high as 6th in the country during Devoy's tenure. Palmer replaced both Mark and Julee Devoy (women's head coach) before the 2016-2017 season. Palmer is the third former world number 1 currently coaching a college squash team, joining Drexel's John White and MIT's Thierry Lincou.

Year-by-year results

Men's Squash 
Updated February 2022.

Players

Current roster 
Updated February 2023.

|}

Notable former players 
Notable alumni include:
 Chris Sachvie '10, 3x All-American, 2x All-Ivy, current Columbia Lions men's squash assistant coach, former Dickinson Red Devils squash coach.
 Nick Sachvie '14, Highest world ranking of no. 64, Ivy League Rookie of the Year, 4x All-American and 4x All-Ivy.

References

External links 
 

 
College men's squash teams in the United States
Squash in New York (state)
Sports clubs established in 1956
1956 establishments in New York (state)